Viktor Andreyevich Shershunov (16 November 1950 – 20 September 2007) was the governor of Kostroma Oblast, Russia, from 1997 to 2007. He previously worked at the Prosecutor's Office of Kostroma Oblast.

Born in Lenger (now Kazakhstan). After graduating from the Kazan State University he was appointed an investigator of the Galich prosecutor's office, and in 1978 he became an investigator, then a senior investigator of the prosecutor's office of Sverdlovsk district of Kostroma. Since 1994, Shershunov worked in the city administration.

Shershunov was elected governor in 1996 and re-elected in 2000 with a large majority. In 2005, he was reappointed by Vladimir Putin after direct elections for governors was replaced with presidential appointment.

He was a member of the Communist Party of the Russian Federation. He was also a member of the Federation Council until its reform in 2001. On 20 September 2007, Viktor Shershunov died in a car crash in Moscow Oblast at the 76th kilometer of the Yaroslavl highway. He was buried on September 22 at the central cemetery of Kostroma. He was married and had three sons.

References
Viktor Shershunov profile on Russia Profile
Putin nominates Viktor Shershunov as head of the administration of Kostroma oblast

1950 births
2007 deaths
People from Tole Bi District
Communist Party of the Russian Federation members
Governors of Kostroma Oblast
Members of the Federation Council of Russia (1996–2000)
Road incident deaths in Russia
Heads of the federal subjects of Russia who died in office
Kazan Federal University alumni